Maille is a brand of mustards originated in Marseille, France, in 1723. As a subsidiary of multinational consumer goods company Unilever, which manufactures the mustard at plants globally, the company now also markets cornichons, stoneware, salad dressings, kitchen gifts and oils under the Maille brand—in company stores, through global distribution agreements and online, since 2007.

Maison Maille, the brand, continues to market traditional dijon mustard and flavored variants through dedicated shops in Dijon, London (2013), New York City (2014), Paris (2015), and Bordeaux (2015), as well as in-store concessions in Chicago, Portland, and San Francisco.

History
In 1747, Antoine-Claude Maille opened a boutique called La Maison Maille on the rue Saint-André des Arts in Paris and became official supplier to the court of Louis XV. His father, who shared his name and was also a vinegar-maker, had become famous during the 1720s for recommending the condiment as a plague treatment.

In 1760, Mr. Maille was named official supplier to the courts of Austria and Hungary. In 1769, King Louis XVI granted him the license as “ordinary distiller-vinegar-maker” and two years later he was granted charter as distiller-vinegar-maker to Empress Catherine II of Russia.

Mr. Maille sold his business to his associate André-Arnoult Acloque in 1800 and died in 1804. His son Robert and Mr Alcoque's son Andre-Gabriel became business partners in 1819 and were appointed distillers to the King and sole suppliers to the house of King Louis XVIII in 1821. Maille became vinegar-maker to Charles X in 1826, supplier to the King of England in 1830, and vinegar-maker to King Louis-Philippe in 1836. A Maille boutique opened in the Burgundy region in 1845.

In 1885, Maille was purchased by Maurice Grey of Grey-Poupon. In 1930, Maille was purchased by entrepreneur Baron Philippe de Rothschild. The company's slogan, Que Maille qui m’aille, or "Maille alone suits me", was created in 1931. In 1936, the brand advertised itself by spelling out the word ‘MAILLE’ in lights on Parisian rooftops. This scene was depicted in a cinema advert called Quand on n'en a pas. These campaigns ended after the outbreak of the Second World War.

In 1952, Philippe de Rothschild sold the brand back to André Ricard and Joseph Poupon, deputy CEO of Grey Poupon. Maille and Grey Poupon then joined forces and began marketing in supermarkets.

The company began producing Maille whisky glasses in 1988 and launched its trademark Fleur de Lys jar a year later. It started selling balsamic vinegar in 1991.

In 1996, the firm celebrated the 250th anniversary of the opening of its first store by opening a shop on the Place de la Madeleine in Paris. It sells packaged mustards, oils and vinegars as well as mustard straight from the pump.

Maille was sold to Paribas Affaires Industrielles in 1997 and was purchased by Unilever in 2000. In 2011, the company introduced a Dijon mustard with Chablis "1747", an aged balsamic vinegar and black truffle mustard.

Products

In 1937, Dijon was granted the right to an Appellation Controlee, subjecting it to manufacturing regulations, and prescribing the method by which it may be called a Dijon mustard.

The company has produced condiments using other ingredients, including mango, red berries, tarragon and Cognac.

In 1996, Maille introduced limited-edition mustards delivered on tap from porcelain pumps, each based on a signature ingredient such as Chablis. They included a black truffle and Chablis mustard served in sandstone jars.

References

Mustard brands
Unilever brands